Spectra, stylized as SPECTRA Scotland's Festival of Light (originally Aberdeen's Festival of Light), is an annual public arts festival held each year in Aberdeen, Scotland. The art installations are focused around light, often including sculptures, projections, and installations.

History 

Founded in 2014, the festival has taken place annually in February. From 2015, Aberdeen City Council appointed Curated Place, an arts-led cultural production agency to produce and deliver the event.

2014 
A pilot event, coordinated by Aberdeen-based Peacock Visual Arts,  took place from 6th to 9th February 2014 with the tagline "Aberdeen Festival of Light"

2015 
Participating artists included Jørgen Callesen, Jacob Takeila, Einkofi Productions and Steinunn. Locations included Union Terrace Gardens and His Majesty's Theatre.

2016 
The event ran from 11 to 14 February 2016. Its main space was in Union Terrace Gardens, with other exhibitions added in Marischal College, St Nicholas Kirkyard, and Seventeen on Belmont Street.

2017 
The event took place between 9 and 12 February 2017. It added the Rooftop Garden of the St Nicholas Centre as an exhibition space. It won Festival of the Year 2017 in the Drum awards. It also was voted best family event of the year by Raring2go! magazine.

2018 
The festival took place from 8 to 11 February 2018. Its theme was "Play in the Night" in tribute to Creative Scotland and Event Scotland’s Year of Young People.  Union Terrace Gardens hosted 15 installations, and the front of His Majesty's Theatre was used as a projection surface.

2019 
There was no Spectra Festival in 2019, due to the contract lapsing.

2020 
Spectra returned to Aberdeen in 2020, with displays including tentacles perched on buildings around the city in addition to the usual light displays. Taking its inspiration from Scotland’s Year of Coasts and Waters, Spectra 2020 explored Aberdeen’s position as the connecting point to other cultures on Scotland’s North East coast.

2022 
After the festival was cancelled in 2021, due to the COVID-19 pandemic, Spectra returned to the City in 2022 with a theme of "Scotland’s Year of Stories."

2023 
The theme for the latest incarnation of the Festival, held from 9 to 12 of February, was "Home". Ashley Davis described the festival as "what is best in the Granite City" in The Times. Queues of up to 45 minutes were reported as residents and visitors to Aberdeen visited the festival.

Attendance 
Spectra's attendance figures have been reported as follows.

Gallery

References 

Events in Aberdeen
Winter events in Scotland
Events affected by the COVID-19 pandemic
Festivals in Scotland
Light festivals